Queen Hyosa of the Ansan Gim clan was a Goryeo princess as the daughter of King Hyeonjong and Queen Wonhye, also the full younger sister of King Munjong and King Jeonggan who became the third wife of her half brother, King Deokjong. Since they were once came from the same clan, Queen Hyosa became one of the Goryeo queens who followed their maternal clan.

References

External links
Queen Hyosa on Encykorea .
Queen Hyosa on Naver .

Royal consorts of the Goryeo Dynasty
Year of death unknown
Year of birth unknown
Gim clan of Ansan